Sunbury Cricket Club had a noted team in the early 18th century which played in major matches. One of its players was William Goodwin, whose skill received comment in a 1724 newspaper report. Goodwin is one of the earliest cricketers named in contemporary sources. In 1730, a Sunbury patron known only as Mr Andrews successfully led the team in a match against the Duke of Richmond's XI. In 1731, Sunbury defeated Kent on Sunbury Common. In 1732, a combined Brentford and Sunbury team lost to London on Walworth Common. Little is known of cricket in Sunbury for the next 200 years.
 
The club is representative of Sunbury-on-Thames, which was in Middlesex during the 18th century and is now in Surrey. The modern amateur club, founded in 1938, was a founder member of the Surrey Championship, which since 1999 has been an ECB accredited Premier League, the highest level of recreational club cricket in England and Wales. They also play in the ECB National Club Cricket Championship.

In the early 1970s, the club's Kenton Court Meadow ground hosted three list A matches involving Surrey in the John Player League.

Past players include  former West Indies international Jimmy Adams, Richard Johnson formerly of Somerset, Middlesex and England, David Nash of Middlesex, and Jamie Hewitt formerly of Middlesex and Kent.

Honours 
ECB National Club Cricket Championship - Winners: 1974
Surrey Championship - Winners: 1998, 1988
Three Counties Sunday League - Winners: 2003, 2002

References

External links
Sunbury Cricket Club - official site
Surrey Championship - official site

1938 establishments in England
Cricket in London
Cricket in Middlesex
Cricket in Surrey
English club cricket teams
English cricket teams in the 18th century
Former senior cricket clubs
Sports clubs established in the 1700s
Sunbury-on-Thames